Tropical Nights is a 1928 American silent drama film directed by Elmer Clifton and starring Patsy Ruth Miller,  Malcolm McGregor and Ray Hallor. It is based on the Jack London story A Raid on the Oyster Pirates.

Synopsis
Brothers Harvey and Jim operate a pearl diving barge on an island in the South Seas. Harvey tries it on with a Mary Hale, an opera singer stranded in the area and working in a waterfront dive bar, and is knocked out by her. Shortly afterwards Stavnow robs Harvey of his pearls and kills him when he wakes up and fights back. Mary meets Jim and falls in love, but is guilt-stricken as she believes that she is responsible for his brother's death.

Cast
 Patsy Ruth Miller as Mary Hale  
 Malcolm McGregor as Jim  
 Ray Hallor as Harvey  
 Wallace MacDonald as Stavnow  
 Russell Simpson as Singapore Joe

References

Bibliography
 Goble, Alan. The Complete Index to Literary Sources in Film. Walter de Gruyter, 1999.

External links

1928 films
1928 drama films
Silent American drama films
Films based on works by Jack London
Films directed by Elmer Clifton
American silent feature films
1920s English-language films
Tiffany Pictures films
American black-and-white films
1920s American films